Raja Rani may refer to:

Places
Raja Rani, Nepal, a village in the Dhankuta District of Nepal
Raja Rani lake, a lake in the Morang District of Nepal
Rajarani Temple, a temple in Bhubaneswar, Odisha, India

Film and television
Raja Rani (1942 film), a 1942 Bollywood film
Raja Rani (1956 film), a Tamil film.
Raja Rani (1973 film), a 1973 Hindi film
Raja Rani (2013 film), a Tamil film
Kanden Kadhalai, previously titled Raja Rani, a 2009 Tamil film
Raja Rani (Tamil TV series), a 2017 Tamil soap opera
 Raja Rani (Kannada TV series), a 2021 Kannada television show